Wandle Park is an  park located in the Broad Green Ward of Croydon, south London, England.  It was opened in 1890 by the Mayor of Croydon. The site is protected by Fields in Trust through a legal "Deed of Dedication" safeguarding the future of the space as public recreation land for future generations to enjoy.

The River Wandle flows through the park. Between 1967 and 2012 this was in an underground culvert which was constructed by Croydon Council. The park used to contain a boating lake which dried up and was filled in.

The park is used by many people and is popular with dog walkers, footballers, joggers, skateboarders and families. The park is easily accessible by public transport using Wandle Park tram stop. The park has a 'Friends Group' of local residents and park users that are working with Croydon Council to improve the park.

Geology
River terrace gravels make up the underlying geology of Wandle Park which is composed of succession Woolwich Beds and Reading Beds, Thanet Sands and Upper Chalk. The Thanet Sand Formation makes up part of the water-bearing Chalk-Basal Sands aquifer of the London Basin.  The gravel was deposited during Pleistocene period and has been substantially reworked since then by periglacial, fluvial and anthropogenic impacts.

History

One of the oldest public open spaces in Croydon, Wandle Park was built to meet the leisure and recreation needs of the population of a growing industrial town. The park was formed from two watermeadows to the west of Croydon town called Frog Mead and Stubbs Mead. The deed of sale records that Croydon Corporation bought Frog Mead in 1888 from the Briton Medical & General Life Association Limited for £1,518. 15s. The  of Stubbs Mead was part of the Archbishop of Canterbury's land holdings in Croydon. The Archbishops had long held land in Croydon and their presence was recorded in the Domesday Book. On 12 December 1889, Croydon Corporation bought Stubbs Mead from the Ecclesiastical Commissioners for £2,700. The indenture states that "The land shall be forever dedicated and used as an ornamental pleasure ground and place of recreation for the inhabitants of the Borough of Croydon and for no other purpose whatsoever."

Improvements to the park were overseen by the corporation's Road Committee.  Minutes of the Committee available in Croydon's Local Studies Library record that a Mr W. Powell, the Roads Surveyor was instructed to draw up plans and obtain prices for the works. The centrepiece of the new park was an artificial boating lake with an island in the centre planted with trees. It was proposed to divert the River Wandle to feed the lake with water but whilst the lake was being constructed sufficient groundwater was found for this purpose.  Proposals were then modified and a separate channel took the river to the north of the boating lake. John Hubert Schmitz, the Mayor of Croydon, opened Wandle Park in May 1890.  A newspaper report of the time recorded that approximately 30,000 attended.  The park is featured in postcards produced at the turn of the 20th century which frequently record people enjoying the lake. In the early 20th century the lake was extended to the east and another island created that could be reached by two rustic bridges.  By the 1930s there was a bandstand, bowling green (with pavilion) and tennis courts and the park was the venue for the Borough's Summer Show.

Photographs show that the lake froze in winter and was used for ice-skating. Other photographs of the time show that the water level in the lake was found to be erratic and it completely dried up at times in the summer. In 1967, a concrete culvert was constructed, the river was diverted into it, and the old river bed filled in.  The River Wandle was buried from view and at the same time the then dry lake was filled in, topsoiled and grassed.  The former course of the river was able to be traced by following a line of trees that cross the park.  A flint wall on the southern side of the former location of the children's playground is also thought to be part of the wall on the north side of the river. A rose garden was created in the 1970s next to the sports pavilion and more recently a skatepark was provided on the site of the old tennis courts.

Regeneration

Plans were drawn up in 2010 which proposed bringing the river to the surface and provide facilities including a new cafe, changing facilities, bandstand, pond, multi-use games area, a new playspace and skatepark. A basketball court and a tennis court are located near the skate park. The park has received funding from the adjoining British Gas Site (Barratt Homes providing a Section 106 contribution as part of their planning consent), the Environment Agency, Croydon Council, Heritage Lottery Fund and the Mayor of London's Help a London Park Scheme.

Work on the restoration of the River Wandle within the park began on 14 November 2011, with works to a new skate park and ball courts. The entire park closed on 9 January 2012 for the river restoration works. The upgraded skate park and games area opened on 11 May 2012, and most of the park reopened at the end of December 2012. The new bridge was installed in March 2013. The new play-space opened in the summer of 2013 when the grass under the new facilities became established. The refurbished pavilion was finished in December 2013, with the cafe opening to the public in July 2014.

References

1890 establishments in England
Protected areas established in 1890
Parks and open spaces in the London Borough of Croydon
Urban public parks in the United Kingdom
Skateparks in the United Kingdom